Donlyn Lyndon is an American Third Bay Tradition architect and the Eva Li Professor Emeritus of Architecture and Urban Design at the University of California, Berkeley. Lyndon was a co-designer of Sea Ranch, California.

Education
M.F.A. Architecture, Princeton University
A.B. Architecture, Princeton University

Notable works

Condominium 1

Bibliography

Lyndon, Donlyn and Charles W. Moore. Chambers for A Memory Palace. Cambridge: MIT Press (1996). 
Lyndon, Donlyn. The City Observed: Boston, a guide to the Architecture of the Hub. 1982. 
Lyndon, Donlyn, Curtis W. Fentress, Robert Campbell, John Morris Dixon, Charles Jencks and Coleman Coker. Civic Builders. 2002. 
Lyndon, Donlyn, Giancarlo De Carlo, Peter Smithson, Attilio Petruccioli and Francesco Smassa. The Eastern Lagoon Front. Venice: City of Venice (2001). 
Lyndon, Donlyn, Charles Moore, and Gerald Allen. The Place of Houses. Berkeley: University of California Press (2000). 
Lyndon, Donlyn, Jim Alinder, Donald Cantry and Lawrence Halprin. The Sea Ranch: Fifty Years of Architecture, Landscape, Place, and Community on the Northern California Coast. Princeton: Princeton Architectural Press (2013).

References

Architects from California
UC Berkeley College of Environmental Design faculty
20th-century American architects
Living people
Princeton University School of Architecture alumni
1936 births